31st meridian may refer to:

31st meridian east, a line of longitude east of the Greenwich Meridian
31st meridian west, a line of longitude west of the Greenwich Meridian